Pleșoiu is a commune in Olt County, Oltenia, Romania. It is composed of seven villages: Arcești, Arcești-Cot, Cocorăști, Doba, Pleșoiu, Schitu din Deal and Schitu din Vale.

References

Communes in Olt County
Localities in Oltenia